Kyway  is a 2018 Burmese drama film produced by Bo Bo Film Production. The film was based on the novel Pyaw Tine Yone Tak Pote Thin Nyo by Min Lu and directed by Thar Nyi. In this film, starred Myanmar movie stars, Hlwan Paing, Ei Chaw Po, Tyron Bejay, Ye Aung, Soe Myat Thuzar. The film was produced by Bo Bo Film Production and which screened in Myanmar cinemas on 20 July 2018.

Cast
Hlwan Paing as Nay Min Maung
Ei Chaw Po as Khin Yin Tin
Tyron Bejay as Soe Htet (main villain)
Ye Aung
Soe Myat Thuzar

References

External links

Kyway on Myanmar-Cinema

2018 films
2010s Burmese-language films
Films shot in Myanmar
Burmese drama films
2018 drama films